Thirukonasala Vaipavam is an important literary work in Tamil on the history of historic Koneswaram Temple, Trincomalee, Sri Lanka.

This was written by V. Akilesapillai in 1889 and was first published in 1952 by V. Alahakone, brother of Akilesapillai. It was reprinted in 2000.

Thirukonasala Vaipavam is still considered a valuable document among intellectuals and historians who research the Koneswaram history and history of Tamils in the Trincomalee area.

Sri Lankan Tamil history